Hatvani/Hatvany is a Hungarian surname. The name derives from Hatvan, Hungary. It may refer to:

Hatvani
 István Hatvani (1718–1786), Hungarian mathematician, scientist
 Mihály Hatvani, a penname of Mihály Horváth (1809–1878)

Hatvany
 Sándor Hatvany-Deutsch (1852–1913), Hungarian industrialist
 Ferenc Hatvany (1881–1958)
 Béla Hatvany (1938–), Entrepreneur 
 Baroness Katalin Hatvany de Hatvan (1947–), Hungarian designer

See also
List of titled noble families in the Kingdom of Hungary

Surnames